Bengali theatre primarily refers to theatre performed in the Bengali language.  Bengali theatre is produced mainly in West Bengal, and in Bangladesh. The term may also refer to some Hindi theatres which are accepted by the Bengali people.

Bengali theatre has its origins in British rule. It began as private entertainment in the early 19th century. In the pre-independence period, Bengali theatres played a pivotal role in manifesting dislike of the British Raj. After the independence of India in 1947, leftist movements in West Bengal used theatre as a tool for social awareness. This added some unique characteristics to the art form that still have strong effects. These groups differentiate themselves ideologically from commercial Bengali theatre.

Types

The many theatres in West Bengal can be broadly divided into Kolkata-based theatres and rural theatres. Outside Bengali-speaking areas, the term "Bengali theatre" primarily refers to Kolkata-based groups, as the rural theatres are less well-known. The two types are similar in form and content, but the Kolkata-based theatres are better funded and staffed. This is mainly due to the influx of expertise from rural areas to Kolkata in search of a larger audience.

There are also Bengali folk theatres. There are many dialects of Bengali spoken in West Bengal and Bangladesh. The larger Bengali theatres use the dialect spoken in Kolkata, Bengali folk theatres have performances in some of the other Bengali dialects.

There is another category of Bengali theatre called Jatra, which is run commercially in rural West Bengal and Bangladesh. This traditional Bengali theatre form is mostly performed by travelling troupes. The most prominent characteristics of Jatra are melodramatic contents and presentation, exaggerated expressions and movements, and an extensive use of traditional musical instruments. Jatra originally explored subjects concerning the tales of Radha-Krishna. But at present, it has been modernized to feature crisis through stories. Many popular Bengali film artists participate in Jatra.

Hindi theatres which are accepted by the Bengali people include the productions of Rangakarmee (established 1976) directed by Usha Ganguly, and productions by Padatik (established 1972) under Shyamanand Jalan, who started with Anamika in 1955.

Following the independence of Pakistan in 1947, religion-based nationalism was strong and affected the theatre in eastern Bengal. In East Pakistan (modern-day Bangladesh), playwrights emerged such as Ibrahim Khan (1894-1978), Ibrahim Khalil (b. 1916), Akbar ad-Din (1895-1978) and others. These playwrights would create plays related to the Islamic history of the subcontinent and Middle East, glorifying past Muslim rulers as well as the history of the Pakistan Movement.

Music
The late 19th- and early 20th-century theatres had their own Bengali music. This form was pioneered by Girish Chandra Ghosh; the era of Bengali theatre before him laid the groundwork, and after his death Bengali theatre music became more experimental. During the era of Girish Chandra, all stage-plays included some form of traditional Bengali music, and dancer-singers who performed before and between the acts. Mythological plays would have Kirtan-anga songs, epics would include indigenous styles such as khyāmtā, and comedies and farcical plays often included tappā songs by Nidhu Babu.

Notable people: West Bengal
 Ajitesh Bandopadhyay
 Asit Bandopadhyay
 Sisir Bhaduri
 Ardhendu Sekhar Mustafi
 Bijon Bhattacharya
 Kshirode Prasad Vidyavinode
 Mohit Chattopadhyay
 Utpal Dutt
 Michael Madhusudan Dutta
 Girish Chandra Ghosh
 Debshankar Haldar
 Dinabandhu Mitra
 Manoj Mitra
 Sambhu Mitra
 Tripti Mitra
 Shobha Sen
 Soumitra Chattopadhyay
 Dwijendralal Ray
 Badal Sarkar
 Rudraprasad Sengupta
 Jyotirindranath Tagore
 Rabindranath Tagore
 Ramaprasad Banik
 Kaushik Sen
 Bratya Basu
 Goutam Halder
 Arun Mukherjee
 Anirban Bhattacharya
 Debesh Chattopadhyay

Notable people: Bangladesh
 Abdullah Al Mamun
 Abdul Kader
 Abul Hayat
 Abul Khair
 Abdullah Hel Mahmud
 Afsana Mimi
 Ahmed Rubel
 Aly Zaker
 Asaduzzaman Noor
 ATM Shamsuzzaman
 Azizul Hakim
 Bijori Barkatullah
 Ejajul Islam
 Enamul Haque
 Ferdousi Mazumder
 Faiz Zahir
 Golam Mustafa
 Hridi Haque
 Humayun Faridi
 Jayanta Chattopadhyay
 Khairul Alam Sabuj
 KS Firoz
 Laila Hasan
 Litu Anam
 Lucky Enam
 Lutfun Nahar Lata
 Malay Bhowmick
 Mamunur Rashid
 Masud Ali Khan
 Momtazuddin Ahmed
 Munier Choudhury
 Nasiruddin Yousuff
 Nazma Anwar
 Nazmul Huda Bachchu
 Natyaguru Nurul Momen
 Sara Zaker
 Saleh Ahmed
 Shabnam
 Shahiduzzaman Selim
 Shamima Nazneen
 Shanta Islam
 Sikandar Abu Zafar
 Selim Al Deen
 Subhash Dutta
 Suborna Mustafa
 Tamalika Karmakar
 Wahida Mollick Jolly

Notable theatre groups: West Bengal
 Bohurupee Kolkata, India
 Bratyajon West Bengal, India
 Indian People's Theatre Association (IPTA) and its branches
 Nandikar Kolkata, India
 Chetana Kolkata, India
 Swapnasandhani Kolkata, India
 Sansriti Kolkata, India
 Bengal Repertory

 Sahil Nandi

References

Further reading

 Bengali stage, 1795-1873, by Brajendra Nath Banerjee. Published by Ranjan Pub. House, 1943.
 Bengali theatre, by Kironmoy Raha. Published by National Book Trust, India, 1978.
 The story of the Calcutta theatres, 1753-1980, by Sushil Kumar Mukherjee. Published by K.P. Bagchi, 1982.
 The Bengali Drama: Its Origin and Development, by P. Guha-Thakurta. Published by Routledge, 2001. . Excerpts

 
Culture of West Bengal
Theatre in India
Theatre in Bangladesh